Eastern Catholic victims of Soviet persecutions include bishops and others among the tens of thousands of victims of Soviet persecutions from 1918 to approximately 1980, under the state ideology of Marxist–Leninist atheism.

From 1917 to 1939

During the Second World War
Two months after his election on May 12, 1939, in Singolari Animi, a papal letter to the Sacred  Congregation of the  Oriental Church,   Pius XII reported again the persecutions of the Catholic faith in the Soviet Union. Three weeks later, while honouring the memory of Saint Vladimir on the 950th anniversary of his baptism, he welcomed Ruthenian priests and bishops and members of the Russian colony in Rome,  and prayed for those who suffer in their country, awaiting with their tears the hour of the coming of the Lord.

Suppression of Eastern Catholic Churches by Stalin

Ruthenian Church
After World War II, the Russian Orthodox Church was given some freedom by the atheist government of Joseph Stalin, which held to the doctrine of Marxist–Leninist atheism. However, the Eastern Catholic (also called Oriental) Churches which were united with Rome, were persecuted. Leaders of the Orthodox Oriental Churches faced intense pressure to break with Rome and unite with Moscow. Pope Pius addressed specifically the Ruthenian Catholic Church located in Ukraine. Some Ruthenian Catholics call themselves Rusyns. They speak a dialect of the Ukrainian language. The traditional Rusyn homeland extends into northeast Slovakia and the Lemko region of southeast Poland. Until 1922, the area was largely a  part of Austria-Hungary. After much of the area was added to Poland, which follows the Latin rite, Polonisation and significant problems for all Orthodox and Uniate Christians developed.  Some  Ruthenians,  resisting  Polonisation, felt deserted by the Vatican and returned to the Russian Orthodox Church during the Pontificate of Pope Pius XI.

Ukrainian Greek Catholic Church
After 1945, it was claimed that the Union of Brest was a Polish conspiracy to dominate and wipe out the Oriental culture of the Ukrainian Greek Catholic Church:  Uniate and Orthodox faithful and priests had to suffer under Polish bishops of the Latin Rite and Polonisation. But now they are liberated by the Soviet Army  under the leadership of the incomparable Marshal Joseph Stalin and therefore, continued ties to Rome are no longer  necessary.

Role of Russian Orthodox Patriarch
The new Patriarch, Alexius I of Moscow   called on all Catholics in the Soviet Union for a separation from Rome:
 Liberate yourself! You must break the Vatican chains, which throw you into the abyss of error, darkness and spiritual decay. Hurry, return to your true mother, the Russian Orthodox Church! 

Pope Pius XII replied: "Who does not know, that Patriarch Alexius I recently elected by the dissident bishops of Russia, openly exalts and preaches defection from the Catholic Church. In a letter lately addressed to the Ruthenian Church, a letter, which contributed not a little to the persecution?".

Orientales omnes Ecclesias
Orientales omnes Ecclesias refers to United Nations resolutions of a world of tolerance, free of religious persecution . Pius continues,  This had given us hope that peace and true liberty would be granted everywhere to the Catholic Church, the more so since the Church has always taught, and teaches, that obedience to the ordinances of the lawfully established civil power, within the sphere and bounds of its authority, is a duty of conscience. But, unfortunately, the events we have mentioned have grievously and bitterly weakened, have almost destroyed, our hope and confidence so far as the lands of the Ruthenians are concerned.

The Pope knew about the attempts to separate  the Uniate churches from Rome, and was also aware, that in months preceding the  encyclical Orientales omnes Ecclesias,  all Catholic bishops of the Ukrainian Church had been arrested.  Josyf Slipyj, Gregory Chomysyn, John Laysevkyi, Nicolas Carneckyi,  Josaphat Kocylovskyi  Some, including  Bishop Nicetas Budka perished in Siberia.

Show trials
Subjected to Stalinist show trials, they all received  severe sentencing. The remaining leaders of the hierarchies and  heads of all seminaries and Episcopal offices were arrested and tried in 1945 and 1946.  July 1, 1945, some three hundred priests of the United Church wrote  to Molotov. They  protested the arrest of all bishops and large parts of the Catholic clergy. After the  Church was thus robbed of all its leadership, a “spontaneous movement” for separation from Rome, and unification with the Russian Orthodox Church developed. Mass arrests of priests followed. In Lemko, some five hundred priests were jailed in 1945 or sent to a Gulag, officially called, “an unknown destination because of political reasons”.

Subsequent confiscation of properties
The Catholic Church was annihilated, Church institutions were confiscated and expropriated; churches, monasteries and seminaries closed and looted. After the war, the Catholic Uniate churches were integrated under the Moscow Patriarchy,  after all residing bishops and apostolic administrators were arrested on March 6, 1946. The Catholic Church of Ukraine was thus liquidated. All properties were turned over to the Orthodox Church under the Patriarch of Moscow.

Some persecuted bishops 

 Nykyta Budka
 Walter Ciszek
 Potapy Emelianov
 Leonid Feodorov
 Clement Sheptytsky
 Josyf Slipyj
 Vasyl Velychkovsky
 Theodore Romzha

Papal encyclicals on the persecution
The encyclical Orientales omnes Ecclesias is a summary of the relations between the Uniated (Eastern) churches and Rome until the persecutions 1945. Pope Pius XII presents  a comprehensive historical review of the reunion, to show the many trials and bloody persecutions but also the  advantages of the union to the faithful in Ukraine. In Sacro Vergente this history is repeated with view to relations with Russia in general. He again rejects communism but not communists. Those who err, are always welcome. At Saint Josaphat College he mourns the terrible changes of the past twenty years in Russia, bishops incarcerated, in concentration camps, banned from their homes, killed while in jail, for one reason only, they are faithful to the Holy See.

Orientales Ecclesias reviews the efforts of the Vatican of improving relations with the oriental Churches. Pope Pius XII mentions the naming of an Oriental Cardinal Grégoire-Pierre Agagianian, and the reform of the Eastern Canon Law as two examples. But the most flourishing Christian communities are wiped out without trace these days. He does not know details except that many bishops and priests are deported to unknown destinations, to concentration camps and to jails, while some are under house arrest. AAS 1952, Orientales Ecclesias 5 In Bulgaria, Bishop Bossilkoff was executed with many others. But Bulgaria is not alone. Many are robbed of the most basic natural and human rights, and mistreated in the most extreme ways. The suffering in Ukraine is immense.  The Pope refers specifically to the Kiev show trial against bishops of the oriental Church. Still there is reason for comfort and hope: The strength of the faithful. The Christian faith makes better citizens, who use their God-given freedom to work for their societies to further the causes of justice and unity. The Pope concludes by requesting worldwide public prayers for the persecuted, and hopes that they may open the jails and loosen the chains in those countries.

Novimus Nos is a letter to the bishops of the Oriental rite asking for faith, strength and hope. The Pope expresses his ardent desire for unity of all Eastern Christians with the Western church and comforts those who  suffer in jail or unknown locations for their faith and faithfulness to the Holy See. In Fulgens corona, dedicated to 100th anniversary of the dogma of the Immaculate Conception of the Virgin Mary, Pope Pius reminds the whole world of the sufferings and persecutions in Russia and dedicates her to the special protection of Mary, who has so many Russian followers.

 1.	Singulari Animi, Apostolic Letter, May 12, 1939, AAS  1939, 258
 2.	The 950th Anniversary of the Baptism of St Wladimir, Discorsi 1939, 163
 3.	Orientales omnes Ecclesias, Encyclical, AAS 1946, 33
 4.	Sempiternus Rex, Encyclical, September 8, 1951, AAS 1951, 624
 5.	Sacro Vergente,  Apostolic letter, July 7, 1952,  AAS 1952,  505
 6.	Speech to the St. Josaphat College, December 15, 1952, AAS 1952, 876
 7.	Orientales Ecclesias, encyclical,  December 15, 1952, AAS 1953,  5
 8.	Novimus Nos,  apostolic letter, January 20, 1956, AAS 1956,  260
 9.	Fulgens corona encyclical, September 8, 1954,  AAS 1954,  577

Destalinization period
After Joseph Stalin died in 1953, “peaceful coexistence” became subject of numerous discussions. In his Christmas Message of 1954, Pius XII defined possibilities and preconditions for peaceful coexistence. He indicated Vatican willingness to practical cooperation, whenever possible in the interest of the faithful. The slow pace of de-Stalinisation and the Soviet crackdown on the Hungarian Revolution did not produce results, aside from modest improvements in Poland and Yugoslavia after 1956. January 1958, Soviet Foreign Minister Andrey Gromyko expressed willingness of Moscow, to have formal relations with the Vatican in light of the position of Pope Pius XII on World peace and the uses of atomic energy for peaceful purposes, a position, which he claimed was identical with Kremlin policy. The Vatican did not respond officially, and reported unofficial contacts will not be known until 2028, when Vatican Archives open access to all documents of the pontificate of Pius XII.

Later persecutions in the 1960s and 1970s

See also 
 Persecutions of the Catholic Church and Pius XII
 Persecution of Christians in the Soviet Union
 Persecution of Christians in Warsaw Pact countries

References 
 Acta Apostolicae Sedis ( AAS), Roma, Vaticano 1922-1960
 Owen Chadwick, The Christian Church in the Cold War, London 1993
 Richard Cardinal Cushing,  Pope Pius XII,  St. Paul Editions, Boston,  1959
 Victor Dammertz OSB,   Ordensgemeinschaften und Säkularinstitute,  in  Handbuch der Kirchengeschichte,  VII, Herder  Freiburg, 1979, 355-380
 A Galter,  Rotbuch der verfolgten Kirchen,   Paulus Verlag, Recklinghausen, 1957,
 Alberto Giovannetti, Pio XII  parla alla Chiesa del Silenzio, Editrice Ancona, Milano, 1959, German translation, Der Papst spricht zur Kirche des Schweigens, Paulus Verlag, Recklinghausen, 1959
 Herder Korrespondenz  Orbis Catholicus, Freiburg,  1946–1961
 Pio XII Discorsi e Radiomessagi,  Roma Vaticano1939-1959,
 Jan Olav Smit,  Pope Pius XII, London Burns Oates & Washbourne LTD,1951

Sources 

 
Religious persecution by communists
Anti-Catholicism in the Soviet Union
Anti-Catholicism
Persecution by atheist states

cs:Římskokatolická církev v Rusku
fr:Église catholique romaine en Russie
ru:Католицизм в России